La Selle-Craonnaise is a commune in the Mayenne department in north-western France.

Sights
 Church of Saint-Martin, 12th century to 19th century.
 17th century Castle Saint-Amadour and its park.
 Pond of the Rincerie, leisure center.

See also
Communes of the Mayenne department

References

Sellecraonnaise